The Little Mermaid: Ariel's Beginning (also known by the working title, The Little Mermaid III: Ariel's Beginning or The Little Mermaid 3: Ariel's Beginning) is a 2008 American animated direct-to-video fantasy film produced by DisneyToon Studios, With the animation production being done by Toon City Animation and DisneyToon Studios Australia, and a prequel to Disney's 1989 animated film The Little Mermaid and the third and final installment in The Little Mermaid trilogy, as well as the last direct-to-video follow-up after John Lasseter took over as chairman for the Disney Animation Division. It is also the first in the chronology of the story running through the series and it is based on the fairy tale The Little Mermaid of the same name by Hans Christian Andersen and Disney's The Little Mermaid by Walt Disney Animation Japan and Walt Disney Television.

Directed by Peggy Holmes, the film's story is set before the events of the original film, when Ariel is still young, and where all music has been banned from the underwater kingdom of Atlantica by King Triton after being heartbroken at his wife's death, and Ariel attempts to challenge this law. Jodi Benson and Samuel E. Wright (in his final film role) reprise their roles as Ariel and Sebastian respectively, while Sally Field voices the film's new villainess, Marina Del Rey. Jim Cummings takes over the role as King Triton, replacing Kenneth Mars, who had been diagnosed with pancreatic cancer.

The film was released by Walt Disney Studios Home Entertainment on August 26, 2008. It received mixed reviews, with mild criticism aimed at the new villain character and music score, while the animation quality, the script and voice performances were praised.

Plot

King Triton and his wife, Queen Athena, rule over the underwater kingdom of Atlantica, filled with music and laughter. They have seven young daughters: Attina, Alana, Adella, Aquata, Arista, Andrina and the youngest of whom is Ariel. One day, while the merpeople relax in a lagoon above the surface, Triton gifts Athena a music box. However, the merfolk flee at the approach of a pirate ship. Everyone escapes except Athena, who, while trying to recover the music box, is killed when the ship crashes into the lagoon. Devastated by his wife's death, Triton throws the music box away and permanently bans music from Atlantica.

Ten years later, Ariel and her sisters live under a strict routine maintained by their governess, Marina Del Rey and her assistant, Benjamin the manatee. Marina hates being the girls' governess and longs to be Triton's attaché, a job currently filled by Sebastian the crab. Ariel is frustrated by their current lifestyle, which brings her into arguments with her father. One day, Ariel encounters Flounder, a young tropical fish whom she later follows to an underground music club. She is overjoyed by the presence of music, and is shocked when she sees Sebastian performing there. When her presence is revealed, the entire band stops playing and hides, believing Ariel will tell her father about them. Ariel sings a song explaining her love of music and the remembrance of her mother; and is then accepted as a member of the club after swearing an oath of secrecy.

Ariel returns to the palace and her sisters confront her over her disappearance, she explains where she was and the following night the girls go to the club to have fun. Marina finds them and she later reports their activities to Triton, who destroys the club with his trident. Sebastian, Flounder and the band are sent to prison, while Marina is given Sebastian’s position. The girls are confined to the palace as punishment for listening music. Ariel angrily retorts that this is not what her mother would have wanted. 

That night, Ariel frees her friends and leaves Atlantica. Sebastian leads them to a deserted place far away from the palace where Ariel finds Athena's music box, as Sebastian hoped. Ariel, Flounder, and Sebastian decide to return to Atlantica to bring the music box to Triton, hoping that it will change his mind, as he has not remembered how to be happy after Athena's death. Meanwhile, Triton is informed that Ariel is missing and he orders his guards to find her. Marina, wanting to retain her position, releases her electric eels in order to hunt down and eliminate Ariel and Sebastian.

Ariel and her friends are confronted by Marina on their way back and a struggle ensues. Ariel’s friends defeat Marina’s eels, just as Triton arrives. Marina barrels towards Sebastian and tries to kill him, but Ariel blocks her way, getting hit in the process, and falls, apparently dead. Triton witnesses this and blames himself. He sings to Ariel and she revives; the two of them reconcile. Marina and Benjamin are imprisoned in the dungeon. Music is soon restored to Atlantica and everyone celebrates; while Sebastian is appointed Atlantica's first official court composer.

Voice cast

 Jodi Benson as Ariel. 
 Samuel E. Wright as Sebastian. This was ultimately Wright's last film role. 
 Jim Cummings as King Triton.
 Cummings also voices Shelbow, a member of the Catfish Club Band.
 Sally Field as Marina Del Rey. 
 Parker Goris as Flounder. 
 Kari Wahlgren as Attina, the eldest sister who keeps the others in order and is always following her father's words. 
 Tara Strong as:
 Adella, the third eldest sister who dreams of falling in love with a boy.
 Andrina, the second youngest sister who is sarcastic and likes to joke around. 
 Jennifer Hale as Alana, the second eldest sister who is interested in beauty, fashion and is very cautious with her appearance. 
 Grey DeLisle as:
 Aquata, the middle sister who is tough, but shy and can't dance.
 Arista, the third youngest sister who is very quirky and often "borrows" other people's things. She joins the band at the end of the movie.
 Jeff Bennett as Benjamin, Marina's mild-mannered sidekick.
 Bennett also voices the Swordfish Guards who patrol the palace.
 Lorelei Hill Butters as Queen Athena
 Andrea Robinson as Queen Athena's singing voice
 Rob Paulsen as Ink Spot and Swifty, members of the Catfish Club Band.
 Kevin Michael Richardson as Cheeks and Ray-Ray, members of the Catfish Club Band.

Production 
The film's working title was The Little Mermaid III, and it was originally scheduled for a mid-2007 release. When John Lasseter took over Disney Animation, more resources were spent on completing Cinderella III: A Twist in Time, and attention only returned to this film in July 2006 after the wrap up of Cinderella III.

A teaser trailer and musical preview of the film (an alternate version of "Jump in the Line") were attached to the Platinum Edition DVD of The Little Mermaid, which was released in October 2006. At the time, the working title The Little Mermaid III was still being used.

Like The Little Mermaid II: Return to the Sea, this film uses digital ink and paint with the use of the Toon Boom Harmony software.

Soundtrack 

The score to the film was composed by James Dooley, who recorded the score with a 72-piece ensemble of the Hollywood Studio Symphony, as well as a big band, at the Sony Scoring Stage. The film features new songs written by Jeanine Tesori, along with covers of previously recorded calypso songs that were arranged by Dooley. No soundtrack has been released yet for the film.

Release 
The film was released on Region 1 DVD in the United States on August 26, 2008, and on Region 2 DVD in the United Kingdom and Europe on September 22, 2008. The DVD contains special features including deleted scenes, a production featurette hosted by the director, games and activities, and a featurette hosted by Sierra Boggess (who played Ariel on Broadway) about the Broadway musical.

On December 16, 2008, the film was released in a "The Little Mermaid Trilogy" boxed set that includes The Little Mermaid (Platinum Edition) and The Little Mermaid II: Return to the Sea. On November 19, 2013, it was released on Blu-ray as a 2-movie collection alongside the sequel.

In 2019, the film was released on Disney+.

Censorship in the United Kingdom 
In the United Kingdom, the word "spastic" was cut from an interactive game in the extra features of the DVD and Blu-Ray releases by the BBFC to achieve a "U" rating. An uncut version was available rated "12".

The word appears uncensored in all versions of the full-length feature.

Reception 
The DVD became the top-selling DVD for the week ending August 31, selling 980,237 copies.

On the review aggregate website Rotten Tomatoes, 33% of 6 critic reviews are positive. The new villain, Marina Del Rey, was criticized as a poor follow-up to Ursula. The animation quality of the film has been praised as being "impressive" for a direct-to-video and comparable to that of the original film.  A mildly negative review has described that in the film "goofiness often gets buried too often underneath a blah story that's much too run-of-the-mill to allow the emotional oomph of the characters' plights to truly impact". The music has also been criticized as being unmemorable, with one review stating that "to label this a musical would be false advertising".

References

External links 

 
 
 
 

2008 films
2000s American animated films
2008 direct-to-video films
2000s musical fantasy films
American musical fantasy films
American children's animated fantasy films
American children's animated musical films
Direct-to-video prequel films
Disney direct-to-video animated films
DisneyToon Studios animated films
Little Mermaid Ariel's Beginning
Films directed by Peggy Holmes
Films scored by James Dooley
Films set in a fictional country
Films about dysfunctional families
Buddhist media
Films with screenplays by Evan Spiliotopoulos
2008 directorial debut films
Films based on The Little Mermaid
Films about father–daughter relationships
2000s English-language films
American prequel films